1 German-Netherlands Corps (1GNC) is a multinational formation consisting of units from both the Royal Netherlands Army and German Army. The corps' headquarters also takes part in NATO Response Force readiness rotations. It is situated in Münster (Northrhine Westphalia), formerly the headquarters of the German Army's I. Corps out of which 1 German-Netherlands Corps evolved. The corps has national and multinational operational responsibilities.

Due to its role as a NATO High Readiness Forces Headquarters, soldiers from other NATO member states, the United States, Norway, Spain, Italy, the United Kingdom, France, Greece, Turkey, Czech Republic and Belgium are also stationed in Münster.

History
In 1991 the defence ministers of The Netherlands and Germany decided to establish a binational Headquarters to replace one German Corps Headquarters and one Dutch Corps Headquarters. In 1993 a treaty between the two countries was signed which resulted in two previously independent Headquarters being amalgamated to form 1 German-Netherlands Corps HQ, consisting of one German and one Dutch division.

I German Corps had previously consisted of 1st Panzer Division, 3rd Panzer Division, 7th Panzer Division, 11th Panzergrenadier Division, and 27th Airborne Brigade. After the end of the Cold War, various corps troops, such as Air defense command 1, Pioneer command 1 and Medical command 1 were dissolved in September 1993. For the I Corps Headquarters itself the plans saw first of all that it should be amalgamated in Mönchengladbach with the Territorial Northern Command. However, new considerations to multinational units meant that the German I. Korps Headquarters was disbanded in August 1995, being merged into the 1 German-Netherlands Corps.

The corps' readiness for action was achieved on August 30, 1995, and celebrated in the presence of the Dutch Prime Minister Wim Kok and the German Chancellor Helmut Kohl. The headquarters were chosen to be in Münster because Münster was already the location of the I German Corps' headquarters. On top of that it was chosen due to the particular significance for both countries as the place where the Peace of Westphalia was signed.

In 1997, Germany and the Netherlands laid down the cooperation in several documents. In general, these state that Germany and the Netherlands provide the Corps framework on an equal basis; both countries share the responsibility for command & control capabilities. In 2002, the Corps met NATO Full Operational Capability criteria and was certified to act as a High Readiness Force Headquarters capable of rapid deployment as part of a NATO Combined Joint Task Force. Since 2002, the multinational Corps HQ has been based on a Memorandum of Understanding between 12 NATO nations.

The original tasks of the corps lay in the defence of the territories of NATO member states as part of NATO's main defence force as well as taking part in peacekeeping missions, humanitarian missions and emergency aid during natural disasters.

Soon after its Final Operational Capability, the corps was given new tasks: it was designated "Forces Answerable to the Western European Union", and since December 1999, the corps is a Land Component Command within NATO's command structure. At this time its subordinated divisions were the 1st German Panzer Division from Military District Command II in Hannover, and the Netherlands 1st Division 7 December, a mechanised infantry formation stationed in Apeldoorn. 

At the same time, the transition to a multinational unit began, which included considerable issues in organisational psychology between the two forces. After concluding exercise "Cannon Cloud" at the Baumholder training area in November 2002, the corps became a "High Readiness Forces (Land) Headquarters" (HRF(L) HQ) as part of NATO's Combined Joint Task Force (CJTF). The first deployment within this framework took place between February and August 2003 when the corps operated as ISAF's headquarters in Afghanistan. (HQ ISAF-3), following the command periodes of the United Kingdom (ISAF-1) and Turkey (ISAF-2)

Land Component Command 

Following this, the "Land Component Command" was further developed. From the beginning of 2004, the corps was subordinate to NATO Allied Joint Force Command Naples and became "NATO Response Force-Headquarters" (NRF) in November 2004. During the first half of 2005 it was on stand-by as the fourth headquarters NRF-4.

From January to July 2005, the Corps assumed the standby role as the NATO Response Force Land Component Command to demonstrate the NATO Initial Operational Capability. During the months of May and June 2005, 1GNC practiced this capability by conducting exercise IRON SWORD, a challenging Deployment Field Training Exercise to practice multinational operations in an expeditionary environment. In deploying more than 6,000 soldiers and 2,500 vehicles by land, air and sea from Central Europe to Norway, the Corps clearly illustrated the progress made during the NATO Response Force standby period and made a real contribution towards the continual development of the NATO Response Force Full Operational Capability.

The Corps was also the on-call High Readiness Force for NATO contingency operations in 2008. In 2009, the Corps deployed to Afghanistan providing the core staff of the International Security Assistance Force (ISAF) and the ISAF Joint Command. The Corps also provided national troop contributions, most notably a 40-man contingent to Regional Command South.

From mid 2013 until January 2014, some 200 multi-national Staff Officers and soldiers deployed to Kabul, Afghanistan, to contribute to the ISAF HQ, ISAF Joint Command and other units.

In 2015, 1GNC was on stand-by for the NRF for the third time. Following the decisions taken in Cardiff, Wales, additionally the Corps was tasked to develop and test the Initial Very High Readiness Task Force concept, which resulted in deployment of units from Belgium, the Czech Republic, Germany, The Netherlands and Norway to the Zagan training Area in Poland to conduct exercise Noble Jump. Due to the security situation at that moment, NATO Secretary General Jens Stoltenberg, SACEUR General Philip Breedlove, four Ministers of Defence as well as some 200 journalists visited the exercise.

Currently, apart from its Staff Support Battalion and Command Information Systems Battalion, the Corps does not have assigned units any longer. Following a (NATO) Force Generation Process, the Corps will get multinational units assigned to create a tailor-made organisation capable of meeting the given tasks. The Corps served as Land Component Command for the NATO Response Force in 2005, 2008, 2015, 2019. In 2023, 1GNC assumed responsibility as Land Component Command NATO Response Force (NRF).

Commanders

Current structure 
In an emergency the corps must be able to deploy and lead a military mission inside and outside NATO territory within twenty to thirty days and in case of being on stand-by for NRF (NATO Response Force) or VJTF (Very High Readiness Joint Task Force) first elements will be deployed within 2 days.

The following units are permanently part of 1GNC:
 Staff Support Battalion (Münster) 
 Communication and Information Systems (CIS) Battalion (Eibergen and Garderen)

Both these units are fully binational, manned with German and Dutch soldiers.

See also
Franco-German Brigade

Notes

External links
 Official website
 Official Facebook-Account
 Lt. Gen. Andreas Marlow, German Army, and Lt. Col. Wilson C. Blythe Jr., U.S. Army, "Multi-Domain Warfighting in NATO: The 1 German-Netherlands Corps View", Military Review (May-June 2022): https://www.armyupress.army.mil/Journals/Military-Review/English-Edition-Archives/May-June-2022/Blythe/ 

Army corps of the Bundeswehr
Army units and formations of the Netherlands
Multinational army units and formations
Germany–Netherlands military relations
Military units and formations established in 1995
NATO Rapid Deployable Corps